Khampheng Boupha (15 January 1923 – 2011) was a Laotian politician, who served as a member of the Central Committee of the Lao People's Revolutionary Party and President of the Lao Women's Union.

Early life
Khampheng Boupha was born in Luang Prabang and completed her schooling from there.

Career
Khampheng began her career as a teacher and later took up translation work. From 1946 to 49, she stayed in Thailand with her husband, a member of the Lao Issara government. A year later, both of them joined the Free Laos Front. She won the May 1958 supplementary elections for Luang Prabang and became a member of the National Assembly of Laos. It was during this time that the Boupha couple was actively involved with the Pathet Lao communist movement in Vietnam.

In 1979, Khampheng became a member of the newly formed Lao Front for National Construction's Standing Committee and three years later was elected to the Central Committee of the Lao People's Revolutionary Party. Owing to health issues, she did not stand for re-election. She has also served as president of Lao Women's Union and Secretary of State for Rural Affairs.

Personal life
In 1943, Khampheng married Khamphay Boupha. She died in 2011.

References

1923 births
2011 deaths
Lao People's Revolutionary Party politicians
20th-century Laotian women politicians
20th-century Laotian politicians
Members of the 2nd Central Committee of the Lao People's Revolutionary Party
Members of the 3rd Central Committee of the Lao People's Revolutionary Party
Members of the National Assembly of Laos
People from Luang Prabang